Linné Nanette Ahlstrand (July 1, 1930 – January 18, 1967) was an American model and actress.  She was Playboy magazine's Playmate of the Month for its July 1958 issue. Her centerfold was photographed by Frank Bez.

Ahlstrand moved to New York City from Hollywood, California to pursue an acting and modeling career. She appeared in such movies as Living Venus, Beast from Haunted Cave, and in such TV Shows as Highway Patrol, and Johnny Stacatto.  She returned to the Los Angeles area in September, 1965, when she got married. Ahlstrand continued to pursue an acting and modeling career before her untimely death to cancer at age 36 in Pasadena, California in 1967.

Filmography
 Senior Prom (1958)
 Living Venus (1961)
 Staccato (1959) as Anona
 Beast from Haunted Cave (1959) as Natalie, the barmaid
 Highway Patrol - "Temptation" (1957), "Slain Cabby" (1957), "Deaf Mute" (1958),  "Insulin" (1958), "Mother's March" (1958)  as Dispatcher

See also
 List of people in Playboy 1953–1959

References

External links
 
 

1936 births
1967 deaths
Actresses from Chicago
1950s Playboy Playmates
20th-century American actresses